Arnold W. Proskin (born April 2, 1938) is an American politician who served in the New York State Assembly from 1985 to 1994.

Arnold Proskin was a bulwark of Republican politics in the Capital Region.

References

1938 births
Living people
Albany County District Attorneys
Republican Party members of the New York State Assembly